The lesser black krait (Bungarus lividus) is a species of venomous elapid snake found in India, Bangladesh, and Nepal.
The specific epithet is after Latin lividus, meaning “bluish metal-colored” or “lead-colored”, referring to the snake's coloration.

Description
The Lesser black krait is a rather small sized snake. The body (dorsum) is smooth and black to bluish-black in colour. The upper lip is white. The ventrals are white with grey edges.
The eyes are small, black with round pupils. Eyes are positioned more towards the snout.
The scales are arranged in 15 dorsal rows (15:15:15). The mid-dorsal (vertebral) scales are only slightly enlarged than the other rows. Anal and subcaudal scales are undivided. 7 supralabials(3rd & 4th touches eye), 7 infralabials(3rd touches anterior genial); Temporals 1+2; Postocular 2.

Distribution
India(North Bengal, Northeast India), Bangladesh, Nepal

Type locality: Assam, India

Ecology

Feeding
The krait is primarily ophiophagous, meaning it preys on other snakes.

References

Further reading 
 Boulenger, G.A. 1890. The Fauna of British India, Including Ceylon and Burma. Reptilia and Batrachia. Taylor & Francis. London. xviii, 541 pp.
 Cantor, T.E. 1839. Spicilegium serpentium indicorum [parts 1 and 2]. Proc. Zool. Soc. London 7: 31–34, 49–55.
 Slowinski, J. B. 1994. A phylogenetic analysis of Bungarus (Elapidae) based on morphological characters. Journal of Herpetology 28(4):440-446.

lividus
Snakes of Asia
Reptiles of Bangladesh
Reptiles of India
Reptiles of Nepal
Reptiles described in 1839
Taxa named by Theodore Edward Cantor